Luapula-Moero District was a district of the pre-2015 Katanga Province in the Belgian Congo and Democratic Republic of the Congo. 
It roughly corresponded in area to the present Haut-Katanga Province.

Belgian Congo

The original four provinces of the Belgian Congo had considerable autonomy, but in 1933 they were reorganized into six provinces, named after their capitals, and the central government assumed more control.
Katanga became Elisabethville Province.
The number of districts in the colony was reduced to 15.
Elisabethville Province was divided into Lualaba District in the west, and  Tanganika and Haut-Katanga in the east.

By 1954 the number of districts in Katanga had been expanded to include the districts of Elisabethville, Tanganika, a smaller Lualaba, Haut-Lomami and Luapula-Moero.
Luapula-Moero District had replaced the smaller Haut-Katanga District, expanded by the addition of territory taken from the east of Lualaba District.
A 1955–1957 map shows Luapula-Moero District bordering Tanganika District to the north, British territories to the east and south, Lualaba District to the west and Haut-Lomami District to the northwest.

Post-independence

On 11 July 1960, a few days after the Congo Republic had gained independence, the province of Katanga seceded as an independent state.
In November 1961 the northern portion was reconquered by the national government and made the province of Nord-Katanga.
On 21 January 1963 the remainder of Katanga was reconquered and divided into the provinces of Lualaba and Katanga Oriental.
Nord-Katanga, Lualaba and Katanga Oriental were merged back into the province of Katanga on 28 December 1966.
In 2015 Haut-Katanga was formed from the Haut-Katanga district and the independently administered cities of Likasi and Lubumbashi.  Lubumbashi retained its status as a provincial capital.

Gallery

See also

 Districts of the Congo Free State
 Districts of the Belgian Congo
 Districts of the Democratic Republic of the Congo

References

Sources

 

Districts of the Congo Free State
Districts of the Belgian Congo
Districts of Katanga Province